Connect Air was a planned Swiss airline headquartered in Basel and based at EuroAirport Basel-Mulhouse-Freiburg.

History
It was established in 2004 as a start-up planning services to various cities in Europe using a fleet of ATR 72-500 aircraft from its base at EuroAirport Basel-Mulhouse-Freiburg. 

The airline however was subsequently shut down without ever starting flight operations.

References

Defunct airlines of Switzerland
Airlines established in 2004
Airlines disestablished in 2008
Swiss companies disestablished in 2008
Swiss companies established in 2004